C32 is a secondary route in Namibia that runs from Karibib in the north to the C28 junction in the south, near the Tsaobis Nature Park.

References 

Roads in Namibia